The Miracle Maker is a 1922 Soviet comedy film directed by Aleksandr Panteleyev.

Cast
 Pyotr Kirillov - Yeremei Mizgir
 Yelena Tumanskaya - Dunya
 Vasili Kozhura - Nicholas I
 Raisa Mamontova - Alexandra Feodorovna

External links

1922 films
1922 comedy films
Soviet comedy films
Russian comedy films
Soviet black-and-white films
Soviet silent feature films
Lenfilm films
Russian silent feature films
Russian black-and-white films
Cultural depictions of Nicholas I of Russia
Silent comedy films